Cotts is a surname. Notable people with the surname include:

Campbell Cotts (1902–1964), South African-British actor
Neal Cotts (born 1980), American baseball player
William Cotts (1871–1932), Scottish businessman and politician

See also
Cotts baronets
Potts (surname)